The Quinebaug River Prehistoric Archeological District encompasses a collection of prehistoric archaeological sites near the Quinebaug River in Canterbury, Connecticut. The district was listed on the National Register of Historic Places in 2009, and was designated a state archaeological preserve in 2003.

Description
The Quinebaug River Prehistoric Archeological District is located in eastern Canterbury, south of the town center on a terrace overlooking the Quinebaug River. It consists of state-owned land on the west bank of the river, east of Connecticut Route 169 south of Connecticut Route 14 and north of Connecticut Route 668. Five separate sites with architectural significance were identified in this area during survey wor conducted in the area in 2001 and 2002. Two of the sites exhibit evidence of Late Archaic occupation, and all are likely to provide additional information through further excavation.

Finds at these sites were significantly more plentiful from the Woodland Period, suggesting a period of more intensive (and possibly long-term) occupation.  The area appears from the stratigraphy to have been less flood-prone then than in the Late Archaic, but there is relatively sparse evidence of the more sedentary agrarian practices of the Late Woodland.  The stone finds at the site are of particular interest, because some of the appear to originate in quarries located some distance away, suggesting that trade networks were well established.

See also
National Register of Historic Places listings in Windham County, Connecticut

References

Archaeological sites on the National Register of Historic Places in Connecticut
Buildings and structures in Windham County, Connecticut
Canterbury, Connecticut
National Register of Historic Places in Windham County, Connecticut
Historic districts on the National Register of Historic Places in Connecticut